The 2012 Seattle Mariners season was the 36th season in franchise history. The Mariners played their 13th full season (14th overall) at Safeco Field and finished with a record of 75-87, 4th place in the AL West.

Regular season

Game log

|-  style="text-align:center; background:#bfb;"
| 1 || March 28 || @ Athletics (@ Tokyo, Japan) || 3–1 (11) || Wilhemsen (1–0) || Carignan (0–1) || League (1) || 44,227 || 1–0 || 
|-  style="text-align:center; background:#fbb;"
| 2 || March 29 || @ Athletics (@ Tokyo, Japan) || 1–4 || Colón (1–0) || Kelley (0–1) || Balfour (1) || 43,391 || 1–1 || 
|-  style="text-align:center; background:#bfb;"
| 3 || April 6 || @ Athletics || 7–3 || Vargas (1–0) || McCarthy (0–1) || – || 35,067 || 2–1 ||
|-  style="text-align:center; background:#bfb;"
| 4 || April 7 || @ Athletics || 8–7 || Hernández (1–0) || Colón (1–1) || League (2) || 16,612 || 3–1 || 
|-  style="text-align:center; background:#fbb;"
| 5 || April 9 || @ Rangers || 5–11 || Darvish (1–0) || Noesí (0–1) || || 42,003 || 3–2 ||
|-  style="text-align:center; background:#fbb;"
| 6 || April 10 || @ Rangers || 0–1 || Feliz (1–0) || Beavan (0–1) || Nathan (2) || 25,753 || 3–3 ||
|-  style="text-align:center; background:#bfb;"
| 7 || April 11 || @ Rangers || 4–3 || Luetge (1–0) || Nathan (0–2) || League (3) || 32,342 || 4–3 ||
|-  style="text-align:center; background:#fbb;"
| 8 || April 12 || @ Rangers || 3–5 || Holland (1–0) || Vargas (1–1) || Adams (1) || 31,513 || 4–4 ||
|-  style="text-align:center; background:#fbb;"
| 9 || April 13 || Athletics || 0–4 || Colón (2–1) || Hernández (1–1) || || 46,026 || 4–5 ||
|-  style="text-align:center; background:#bfb;"
| 10 || April 14 || Athletics || 4–0 || Noesí (1–1) || Milone (1–1) || || 21,071 || 5–5 ||
|-  style="text-align:center; background:#bfb;"
| 11 || April 15 || Athletics || 5–3 || Beavan (1–1) || Godfrey (0–2) || League (4) || 19,650 || 6–5 ||
|-  style="text-align:center; background:#fbb;"
| 12 || April 17 || Indians || 8–9 || R. Pérez (1–0) || Furbush (0–1) || C. Perez (3) || 12,461 || 6–6 ||
|-  style="text-align:center; background:#bfb;"
| 13 || April 18 || Indians || 4–1 || Vargas (2–1) || Lowe (2–1) || League (5) || 11,343 || 7–6 ||
|-  style="text-align:center; background:#fbb;"
| 14 || April 19 || Indians || 1–2 || Tomlin (1–1) || League (0–1) || Perez (4) || 12,942 || 7–7 ||
|-  style="text-align:center; background:#fbb;"
| 15 || April 20 || White Sox || 3–7 || Sale (2–1) || Noesí (1–2) || || 19,947 || 7–8 ||
|-  style="text-align:center; background:#fbb;"
| 16 || April 21 || White Sox || 0–4 || Humber (1–0) || Beavan (1–2) || || 22,472 || 7–9 ||
|-  style="text-align:center; background:#fbb;"
| 17 || April 22 || White Sox || 4–7 || Danks (2–2) || Millwood (0–1) || Santiago (4) || 19,975 || 7–10 ||
|-  style="text-align:center; background:#bfb;"
| 18 || April 24 || @ Tigers || 7–4 || Vargas (3–1) || Scherzer (1–2) || League (6) || 30,073 || 8–10 ||
|-  style="text-align:center; background:#bfb;"
| 19 || April 25 || @ Tigers || 9–1 || Hernández (2–1) || Wilk (0–3) || || 28,527 || 9–10 ||
|-  style="text-align:center; background:#bfb;"
| 20 || April 26 || @ Tigers || 5–4 || Furbush (1–1) || Porcello (1–2) || League (7) || 31,451 || 10–10 ||
|-  style="text-align:center; background:#bfb;"
| 21 || April 27 || @ Blue Jays || 9–5 (10) || Furbush (2–1) || Pérez (2–1) || || 24,303 || 11–10 ||
|-  style="text-align:center; background:#fbb;"
| 22 || April 28 || @ Blue Jays || 0–7 || Morrow (2–1) || Millwood (0–2) || || 30,765 || 11–11 ||
|-  style="text-align:center; background:#fbb;"
| 23 || April 29 || @ Blue Jays || 2–7 || Álvarez (1–2) || Vargas (3–2) || || 22,320 || 11–12 ||
|-  style="text-align:center; background:#fbb;"
| 24 || April 30 || @ Rays || 2–3 (12) || Howell (1–0) || League (0–2) || || 9,458 || 11–13 ||
|-

|-  style="text-align:center; background:#fbb;"
| 25 || May 1 || @ Rays || 1–3 || Moore (1–1) || Noesí (1–3) || Rodney (8) || 9,972 || 11–14 ||
|-  style="text-align:center; background:#fbb;"
| 26 || May 2 || @ Rays || 4–5 || Shields (5–0) || Beavan (1–3) || Peralta (1) || 9,837 || 11–15 ||
|-  style="text-align:center; background:#fbb;"
| 27 || May 3 || @ Rays || 3–4 || Niemann (2–3) || Millwood (0–3) || Rodney (9) || 11,575 || 11–16 ||
|-  style="text-align:center; background:#fbb;"
| 28 || May 4 || Twins || 2–3 || Pavano (2–2) || Wilhemsen (1–1) || Capps (5) || 22,492 || 11–17 ||
|-  style="text-align:center; background:#bfb;"
| 29 || May 5 || Twins || 7–0 || Hernández (3–1) || Marquis (2–1) || || 28,437 || 12–17 ||
|-  style="text-align:center; background:#bfb;"
| 30 || May 6 || Twins || 5–2 || Noesí (2–3) || Blackburn (0–4) || || 23,913 || 13–17 ||
|-  style="text-align:center; background:#bfb;"
| 31 || May 7 || Tigers || 3–2 || Delabar (1–0) || Dotel (1–1) || || 14,462 || 14–17 ||
|-  style="text-align:center; background:#fbb;"
| 32 || May 8 || Tigers || 4–6 || Verlander (3–1) || Millwood (0–4) || Valverde (6) || 13,455 || 14–18 ||
|-  style="text-align:center; background:#bfb;"
| 33 || May 9 || Tigers || 2–1 || Vargas (4–2) || Putkonen (0–1) || League (8) || 15,655 || 15–18 ||
|-  style="text-align:center; background:#fbb;"
| 34 || May 11 || @ Yankees || 2–6 || Kuroda (3–4) || Hernández (3–2) || || 37,226 || 15–19 ||
|-  style="text-align:center; background:#fbb;"
| 35 || May 12 || @ Yankees || 2–6 || Hughes (3–4) || Noesí (2–4) || Logan (1) || 43,954 || 15–20 ||
|-  style="text-align:center; background:#bfb;"
| 36 || May 13 || @ Yankees || 6–2 || Millwood (1–4) || Pettitte (0–1) || || 41,631 || 16–20 ||
|-  style="text-align:center; background:#fbb;"
| 37 || May 14 || @ Red Sox || 1–6 || Lester (2–3) || Vargas (4–3) || || 37,334 || 16–21 ||
|-  style="text-align:center; background:#fbb;"
| 38 || May 15 || @ Red Sox || 0–5 || Beckett (3–4) || Beavan (1–4) || || 37,292 || 16–22 ||
|-  style="text-align:center; background:#fbb;"
| 39 || May 16 || @ Indians || 3–9 || Jiménez (4–3) || Hernández (3–3) || || 12,092 || 16–23 ||
|-  style="text-align:center; background:#fbb;"
| 40 || May 17 || @ Indians || 5–6 (11) || Smith (4–1) || League (0–3) || || 12,894 || 16–24 ||
|-  style="text-align:center; background:#bfb;"
| 41 || May 18 || @ Rockies || 4–0 || Millwood (2–4) || White (0–3) || || 34,887 || 17–24 ||
|-  style="text-align:center; background:#bfb;"
| 42 || May 19 || @ Rockies || 10–3 || Vargas (5–3) || Friedrich (1–1) || || 30,784 || 18–24 || 
|-  style="text-align:center; background:#bfb;"
| 43 || May 20 || @ Rockies || 6–4 || Beavan (2–4) || Guthrie (2–2) || || 36,662 || 19–24 || 
|-  style="text-align:center; background:#bfb;"
| 44 || May 21 || Rangers || 6–1 || Hernández (4–3) || Darvish (6–2) || || 18,672 || 20–24 || 
|-  style="text-align:center; background:#fbb;"
| 45 || May 22 || Rangers || 1–3 || Harrison (5–3) || Noesí (2–5) || Nathan (10) || 15,604 || 20–25 || 
|-  style="text-align:center; background:#bfb;"
| 46 || May 23 || Rangers || 5–3 || Millwood (3–4) || Feldman (0–2) || League (9) || 23,097 || 21–25 || 
|-  style="text-align:center; background:#fbb;"
| 47 || May 24 || Angels || 0–3 || Haren (2–5) || Vargas (5–4) || || 18,048 || 21–26 || 
|-  style="text-align:center; background:#fbb;"
| 48 || May 25 || Angels || 4–6 || Isringhausen (1–0) || League (0–4) || Downs (4) || 23,517 || 21–27 || 
|-  style="text-align:center; background:#fbb;"
| 49 || May 26 || Angels || 3–5 || Williams (5–2) || Hernández (4–4) || Frieri (2) || 29,483 || 21–28 || 
|-  style="text-align:center; background:#fbb;"
| 50 || May 27 || Angels || 2–4 || Wilson (6–4) || Noesí (2–6) || Downs (5) || 24,467 || 21–29 || 
|-  style="text-align:center; background:#fbb;"
| 51 || May 28 || @ Rangers || 2–4 || Harrison (6–3) || Delabar (1–1) || Nathan (11) || 41,384 || 21–30 || 
|-  style="text-align:center; background:#bfb;"
| 52 || May 29 || @ Rangers || 10–3 || Vargas (6–4) || Feldman (0–3) || || 34,531 || 22–30 || 
|-  style="text-align:center; background:#bfb;"
| 53 || May 30 || @ Rangers || 21–8 || Beavan (3–4) || Holland (4–4) || Iwakuma (1) || 43,580 || 23–30 || 
|-

|-  style="text-align:center; background:#fbb;"
| 54 || June 1 || @ White Sox || 4–7 || Crain (1–0) || Kelley (0–2) || Reed (7) || 19,168 || 23–31 || 
|-  style="text-align:center; background:#bfb;"
| 55 || June 2 || @ White Sox || 10–8 (12) || Wilhelmsen (2–1) || Reed (0–1) || Iwakuma (2) || 26,200 || 24–31 || 
|-  style="text-align:center; background:#fbb;"
| 56 || June 3 || @ White Sox || 2–4 || Sale (7–2) || Millwood (3–5) || || 23,062 || 24–32 || 
|-  style="text-align:center; background:#bfb;"
| 57 || June 4 || @ Angels || 8–6 || Vargas (7–4) || Santana (2–7) || Wilhelmsen (1) || 36,079 || 25–32 || 
|-  style="text-align:center; background:#fbb;"
| 58 || June 5 || @ Angels || 1–6 || Richards (1–0) || Beavan (3–5) || || 35,021 || 25–33 || 
|-  style="text-align:center; background:#bfb;"
| 59 || June 6 || @ Angels || 8–6 || Kelley (1–2) || Williams (6–3) || Wilhelmsen (2) || 37,342 || 26–33 || 
|-  style="text-align:center; background:#bfb;"
| 60 || June 8 || Dodgers || 1–0 || Pryor (1–0) || Elbert (0–1) || Wilhelmsen (3) || 22,028 || 27–33 || 
|-  style="text-align:center; background:#fbb;"
| 61 || June 9 || Dodgers || 3–8 || Kershaw (5–3) || Vargas (7–5) || || 30,287 || 27–34 || 
|-  style="text-align:center; background:#fbb;"
| 62 || June 10 || Dodgers || 2–8 || Billingsley (4–4) || Beavan (3–6) ||  || 34,807 || 27–35 ||
|-  style="text-align:center; background:#fbb;"
| 63 || June 12 || Padres || 4–5 || Richard (3–7) || Hernández (4–5) || Street (6) || 13,084 || 27–36 ||
|-  style="text-align:center; background:#fbb;"
| 64 || June 13 || Padres || 0–1 || Marquis (3–5) || Noesí (2–7) || Street (7) || 13,931 || 27–37 ||
|-  style="text-align:center; background:#fbb;"
| 65 || June 14 || Padres || 2–6 || Vólquez (3–6) || Ramírez (0–1) || || 17,306 || 27–38 ||
|-  style="text-align:center; background:#fbb;"
| 66 || June 15 || Giants || 2–4 || Vogelsong (6–2) || Vargas (7–6) || Casilla (18) || 29,818 || 27–39 ||
|-  style="text-align:center; background:#bfb;"
| 67 || June 16 || Giants || 7–4 || Iwakuma (1–0) || Lincecum (2–8) || Wilhelmsen (4) || 30,589 || 28–39 ||
|-  style="text-align:center; background: #bfb;"
| 68 || June 17 || Giants || 2–1 || Wilhelmsen (3–1) || Romo (2–1) || || 40,603 || 29–39 ||
|-  style="text-align:center; background:#fbb;"
| 69 || June 18 || @ Diamondbacks || 1–7 || Miley (8–3) || Noesí (2–8) || || 24,284 || 29–40 ||
|-  style="text-align:center; background: #bfb;"
| 70 || June 19 || @ Diamondbacks || 12–9 (10) || Furbush (3–1) || Putz (1–4) || Wilhelmsen (5) || 21,568 || 30–40 ||
|-  style="text-align:center; background: #fbb;"
| 71 || June 20 || @ Diamondbacks || 10–14 || Cahill (6–5) || Vargas (7–7) || || 29,630 || 30–41 ||
|-  style="text-align:center; background: #fbb;"
| 72 || June 22 || @ Padres || 5–9 || Richard (5–7) || Millwood (3–6) || Street (9) || 30,053 || 30–42 ||
|-  style="text-align:center; background: #bfb;"
| 73 || June 23 || @ Padres || 5–1 || Hernández (5–5) || Marquis (3–7) || || 30,922 || 31–42 ||
|-  style="text-align:center; background: #fbb;"
| 74 || June 24 || @ Padres || 0–2 || Vólquez (4–7) || Noesí (2–9) || Street (10) || 27,529 || 31–43 ||
|-  style="text-align:center; background: #fbb;"
| 75 || June 25 || Athletics || 0–1 || Milone (8–5) || Ramírez (0–2) || Cook (5) || 17,101 || 31–44 ||
|-  style="text-align:center; background: #bfb;"
| 76 || June 26 || Athletics || 3–2 || Furbush (4–1) || Miller (2–1) || Wilhelmsen (6) || 12,411 || 32–44 ||
|-  style="text-align:center; background: #fbb;"
| 77 || June 27 || Athletics || 1–2 || Parker (4–3) || Iwakuma (1–1) || Cook (6) || 18,158 || 32–45 || 
|-  style="text-align:center; background: #bfb;"
| 78 || June 28 || Red Sox || 1–0 || Hernández (6–5) || Atchison (2–1) || || 20,692 || 33–45 || 
|-  style="text-align:center; background: #fbb;"
| 79 || June 29 || Red Sox || 0–5 || Cook (2–1) || Noesí (2–10) || || 23,094 || 33–46 ||
|-  style="text-align:center; background: #bfb;"
| 80 || June 30 || Red Sox || 3–2 (11) || Kelley (2–2) || Aceves (0–5) || || 31,311 || 34–46 || 
|-

|-  style="text-align:center; background: #fbb;"
| 81 || July 1 || Red Sox || 1–2 (10) || Padilla (2–0) || League (0–5) || Aceves (19) || 34,065 || 34–47 ||
|-  style="text-align:center; background: #bfb;"
| 82 || July 2 || Orioles || 6–3 || Delabar (2–1) || Hammel (8–4) || Wilhelmsen (7) || 14,805 || 35–47 || 
|-  style="text-align:center; background: #fbb;"
| 83 || July 3 || Orioles || 4–5 || O'Day (5–0) || Furbush (4–2) || Johnson (24) || 16,270 || 35–48 ||
|-  style="text-align:center; background: #fbb;"
| 84 || July 4 || Orioles || 2–4 || Tillman (1–0) || Noesí (2–11) || Johnson (25) || 21,982 || 35–49 ||
|-  style="text-align:center; background: #fbb;"
| 85 || July 6 || @ Athletics || 1–4 (11) || Norberto (1–1) || Pérez (0–1) || || 10,819 || 35–50 ||
|-  style="text-align:center; background: #bfb;"
| 86 || July 7 || @ Athletics || 7–1 || Vargas (8–7) || Parker (5–4) || || 16,136 || 36–50 ||
|-  style="text-align:center; background: #fbb;"
| 87 || July 8 || @ Athletics || 1–2 (13) || Norberto (2–1) || Pérez (0–2) || || 20,075 || 36–51 ||
|-  style="text-align:center; background: #fbb;"
| 88 || July 13 || Rangers || 2–3 || Holland (6–4) || Millwood (3–7) || Nathan (19) || 23,721 || 36–52 ||
|-  style="text-align:center; background: #bfb;"
| 89 || July 14 || Rangers || 7–0 || Hernández (7–5) || Darvish (10–6) || || 29,951 || 37–52 ||
|-  style="text-align:center; background: #fbb;"
| 90 || July 15 || Rangers || 0–4 || Harrison (12–4) || Iwakuma (1–2) || || 27,378 || 37–53 ||
|-  style="text-align:center; background: #bfb;"
| 91 || July 16 || @ Royals || 9–4 || Vargas (9–7) || Sánchez (1–6) || || 16,697 || 38–53 ||
|-  style="text-align:center; background:#bfb;"
| 92 || July 17 || @ Royals || 9–6 || Beavan (4–6) || Verdugo (0–1) || Wilhelmsen (8) || 15,769 || 39–53 ||
|-  style="text-align:center; background: #fbb;"
| 93 || July 18 || @ Royals || 7–8 || Holland (4–2) || Kinney (0–1) || || 17,312 || 39–54 ||
|-  style="text-align:center; background:#bfb;"
| 94 || July 19 || @ Royals || 6–1 || Hernández (8–5) || Smith (1–3) || || 16,706 || 40–54 ||
|-  style="text-align:center; background: #fbb;"
| 95 || July 20 || @ Rays || 3–4 (14) || McGee (3–2) || Wilhelmsen (3–2) || || 14,143 || 40–55 ||
|-  style="text-align:center; background:#bfb;"
| 96 || July 21 || @ Rays || 2–1 || Vargas (10–7) || Cobb (4–7) || Wilhelmsen (9) || 18,800 || 41–55 ||
|-  style="text-align:center; background:#bfb;"
| 97 || July 22 || @ Rays || 2–1 || Beavan (5–6) || Moore (6–7) || Wilhelmsen (10) || 20,908 || 42–55 ||
|-  style="text-align:center; background: #fbb;"
| 98 || July 23 || Yankees || 1–4 || Kuroda (10–7) || Millwood (3–8) || Soriano (25) || 29,911 || 42–56 ||
|-  style="text-align:center; background:#bfb;"
| 99 || July 24 || Yankees || 4–2 || Hernández (9–5) || García (4–4) || Wilhelmsen (11) || 31,908 || 43–56 ||
|-  style="text-align:center; background: #fbb;"
| 100 || July 25 || Yankees || 2–5 || Phelps (2–3) || Luetge (1–1) || Soriano (26) || 36,071 || 43–57 ||
|-  style="text-align:center; background:#bfb;"
| 101 || July 26 || Royals || 4–1 || Vargas (11–7) || Mendoza (4–7) || Wilhelmsen (12) || 15,014 || 44–57 ||
|-  style="text-align:center; background:#bfb;"
| 102 || July 27 || Royals || 6–1 || Beavan (6–6) || Guthrie (3–11) || || 14,953 || 45–57 ||
|-  style="text-align:center; background:#bfb;"
| 103 || July 28 || Royals || 4–3 || Millwood (4–8) || Chen (7–9) || Wilhelmsen (13) || 32,111 || 46–57 ||
|-  style="text-align:center; background:#bfb;"
| 104 || July 29 || Royals || 7–6 || Pérez (1–2) || Mijares (2–2) || Wilhelmsen (14) || 19,402 || 47–57 ||
|-  style="text-align:center; background:#bfb;"
| 105 || July 30 || Blue Jays || 4–1 || Iwakuma (2–2) || Romero (8–8) || Luetge (1) || 22,443 || 48–57 ||
|-  style="text-align:center; background:#bfb;"
| 106 || July 31 || Blue Jays || 7–2 || Vargas (12–7) || Laffey (2–2) || || 21,434 || 49–57 ||
|-

|-  style="text-align:center; background:#bfb;"
| 107 || August 1 || Blue Jays || 5–3 || Beavan (7–6) || Villanueva (6–1) ||Wilhelmsen (15) || 22,537 || 50–57 ||
|-  style="text-align:center; background: #fbb;"
| 108 || August 3 || @ Yankees || 3–6 || Sabathia (11–3) || Millwood (4–9) || || 45,872 || 50–58 ||
|-  style="text-align:center; background:#bfb;"
| 109 || August 4 || @ Yankees || 1–0 || Hernández (10–5) || Kuroda (10–8) || || 47,067 || 51–58 ||
|-  style="text-align:center; background: #fbb;"
| 110 || August 5 || @ Yankees || 2–6 || García (5–5) || Iwakuma (2–3) || || 45,878 || 51–59 ||
|-  style="text-align:center; background: #fbb;"
| 111 || August 6 || @ Orioles || 1–3 || Tillman (5–1) || Vargas (12–8) || Johnson (33) || 21,184 || 51–60 ||
|-  style="text-align:center; background: #fbb;"
| 112 || August 7 || @ Orioles || 7–8 (14) || O'Day (6–0) || Kelley (2–3) || || 15,433 || 51–61 ||
|-  style="text-align:center; background: #fbb;"
| 113 || August 8 || @ Orioles || 2–9 || Johnson (1–0) || Millwood (4–10) || || 17,312 || 51–62 ||
|-  style="text-align:center; background: #fbb;"
| 114 || August 10 || @ Angels || 5–6 || Frieri (2–0) || Kinney (0–2) || || 39,016 || 51–63 ||
|-  style="text-align:center; background: #bfb;"
| 115 || August 11 || @ Angels || 7–4 || Iwakuma (3–3) || Haren (8–9) || || 38,722 || 52–63 ||
|-  style="text-align:center; background: #bfb;"
| 116 || August 12 || @ Angels || 4–1 || Vargas (13–8) || Weaver (15–2) || Wilhelmsen (16) || 36,505 || 53–63 ||
|-  style="text-align:center; background: #fbb;"
| 117 || August 13 || Rays || 1–4 || Cobb (7–8) || Beavan (7–7) || Rodney (37) || 16,205 || 53–64 ||
|-  style="text-align:center; background: #bfb;"
| 118 || August 14 || Rays || 3–2 || Pryor (2–0) || Rodney (2–2) || || 17,065 || 54–64 ||
|-  style="text-align:center; background: #bfb;"
| 119 || August 15 || Rays || 1–0 || Hernández (11–5) || Hellickson (7–8) || || 21,889 || 55–64 ||
|-  style="text-align:center; background: #bfb;"
| 120 || August 17 || Twins || 5–3 || Iwakuma (4–3) || Blackburn (4–9) || Wilhelmsen (17) || 22,602 || 56–64 ||
|-  style="text-align:center; background: #bfb;"
| 121 || August 18 || Twins || 3–2 || Wilhelmsen (4–2) || Robertson (1–1) || || 21,154 || 57–64 ||
|-  style="text-align:center; background: #bfb;"
| 122 || August 19 || Twins || 5–1 || Beavan (8–7) || Deduno (4–1) || Kinney (1) || 22,635 || 58–64 ||
|-  style="text-align:center; background: #bfb;"
| 123 || August 20 || Indians || 5–3 || Furbush (5–2) || Smith (7–4) || Wilhelmsen (18) || 14,687 || 59–64 ||
|-  style="text-align:center; background: #bfb;"
| 124 || August 21 || Indians || 5–1 || Hernández (12–5) || Hernández (0–2) || Luetge (2) || 39,204 || 60–64 ||
|-  style="text-align:center; background: #bfb;"
| 125 || August 22 || Indians || 3–1 || Pryor (3–0) || Pestano (3–1) || Wilhelmsen (19) || 18,578 || 61–64 ||
|-  style="text-align:center; background: #fbb;"
| 126 || August 24 || @ White Sox || 8–9 || Reed (3–1) || Wilhelmsen (4–3) || || 25,058 || 61–65 ||
|-  style="text-align:center; background:#fbb;"
| 127 || August 25 || @ White Sox || 4–5 || Jones (6–0) || Beavan (8–8) || Reed (24) || 27,562 || 61–66 ||
|-  style="text-align:center; background:#fbb;"
| 128 || August 26 || @ White Sox || 3–4 (7) || Jones (7–0) || Millwood (4–11) || || 23,146 || 61–67 ||
|-  style="text-align:center; background:#bfb;"
| 129 || August 27 || @ Twins || 1–0 || Hernández (13–5) || Hendriks (0–7) || || 31,883 || 62–67 ||
|-  style="text-align:center; background:#bfb;"
| 130 || August 28 || @ Twins || 5–2 || Iwakuma (5–3) || Diamond (10–6) || Wilhelmsen (20) || 29,854 || 63–67 ||
|-  style="text-align:center; background:#fbb;"
| 131 || August 29 || @ Twins || 0–10 || Deduno (5–2) || Vargas (13–9) || || 29,281 || 63–68 ||
|-  style="text-align:center; background:#bfb;"
| 132 || August 30 || @ Twins || 5–4 || Beavan (9–8) || Duensing (3–10) || Wilhelmsen (21) || 32,578 || 64–68 ||
|-  style="text-align:center; background:#fbb;"
| 133 || August 31 || Angels || 1–9 || Haren (9–10) || Millwood (4–12) || || 17,739 || 64–69 ||
|-

|-  style="text-align:center; background:#fbb;"
| 134 || September 1 || Angels || 2–5 || Santana (8–11) || Hernández (13–6) || Frieri (17) || 22,910 || 64–70 ||
|-  style="text-align:center; background:#bfb;"
| 135 || September 2 || Angels || 2–1 || Iwakuma (6–3) || Weaver (16–4) || Wilhelmsen (22) || 20,584 || 65–70 ||
|-  style="text-align:center; background:#bfb;"
| 136 || September 3 || Red Sox || 4–1 || Vargas (14–9) || Buchholz (11–5) || Wilhelmsen (23) || 21,641 || 66–70 ||
|-  style="text-align:center; background:#fbb;"
| 137 || September 4 || Red Sox || 3–4 || Lester (9–11) || Beavan (9–9) || Bailey (2) || 12,754 || 66–71 ||
|-  style="text-align:center; background:#bfb;"
| 138 || September 5 || Red Sox || 2–1 || Millwood (5–12) || Cook (3–9) || Wilhelmsen (24) || 13,037 || 67–71 ||
|-  style="text-align:center; background:#fbb;"
| 139 || September 7 || Athletics || 1–6 || Griffin (5–0) || Hernández (13–7) || || 17,128 || 67–72 ||
|-  style="text-align:center; background:#fbb;"
| 140 || September 8 || Athletics || 1–6 || Anderson (4–0) || Iwakuma (6–4) || || 23,177 || 67–73 ||
|-  style="text-align:center; background:#fbb;"
| 141 || September 9 || Athletics || 2–4 || Milone (12–10) || Vargas (14–10) || Balfour (16) || 14,403 || 67–74 ||
|-  style="text-align:center; background:#bfb;"
| 142 || September 11 || @ Blue Jays || 4–3 || Ramírez (1–2) || Morrow (8–6) || Wilhelmsen (25) || 12,935 || 68–74 ||
|-  style="text-align:center; background:#bfb;"
| 143 || September 12 || @ Blue Jays || 3–2 || Millwood (6–12) || Romero (8–14) || Wilhelmsen (26) || 13,519 || 69–74 ||
|-  style="text-align:center; background:#fbb;"
| 144 || September 13 || @ Blue Jays || 3–8 || Álvarez (9–12) || Hernández (13–8) || || 13,756 || 69–75 ||
|-  style="text-align:center; background:#fbb;"
| 145 || September 14 || @ Rangers || 3–9 || Darvish (15–9) || Iwakuma (6–5) || || 45,075 || 69–76 ||
|-  style="text-align:center; background:#bfb;"
| 146 || September 15 || @ Rangers || 8–6 || Luetge (2–1) || Scheppers (1–1) || Wilhelmsen (27) || 47,267 || 70–76 ||
|-  style="text-align:center; background:#fbb;"
| 147 || September 16 || @ Rangers || 1–2 || Harrison (17–9) || Beavan (9–10) || Uehara (1) || 45,928 || 70–77 ||
|-  style="text-align:center; background:#fbb;"
| 148 || September 17 || Orioles || 4–10 || Tillman (8–2) || Noesí (2–12) || || 13,036 || 70–78 ||
|-  style="text-align:center; background:#fbb;"
| 149 || September 18 || Orioles || 2–4 (18) || Hunter (5–8) || Luetge (2–2) || Johnson (44) || 12,608 || 70–79 ||
|-  style="text-align:center; background:#fbb;"
| 150 || September 19 || Orioles || 1–3 (11) || Ayala (5–4) || Kinney (0–3) || Johnson (45) || 14,001 || 70–80 ||
|-  style="text-align:center; background:#bfb;"
| 151 || September 21 || Rangers || 6–3 || Iwakuma (7–5) || Pérez (1–2) || Wilhelmsen (28) || 17,893 || 71–80 ||
|-  style="text-align:center; background:#bfb;"
| 152 || September 22 || Rangers || 1–0 || Beavan (10–10) || Harrison (17–10) || Wilhelmsen (29) || 17,671 || 72–80 ||
|-  style="text-align:center; background:#fbb;"
| 153 || September 23 || Rangers || 2–3 || Dempster (12–7) || Vargas (14–11) || Nathan (35) || 19,024 || 72–81 ||
|-  style="text-align:center; background:#fbb;"
| 154 || September 25 || @ Angels || 4–5 || Greinke (15–5) || Ramírez (1–3) || Frieri (21) || 38,538 || 72–82 ||
|-  style="text-align:center; background:#fbb;"
| 155 || September 26 || @ Angels || 3–4 || Frieri (5–2) || Pryor (3–1) || || 37,916 || 72–83 ||
|-  style="text-align:center; background:#bfb;"
| 156 || September 27 || @ Angels || 9–4 || Iwakuma (8–5) || Haren (12–12) || || 37,377 || 73–83 ||
|-  style="text-align:center; background:#fbb;"
| 157 || September 28 || @ Athletics || 2–8 || Griffin (7–1) || Beavan (10–11) || || 16,376 || 73–84 ||
|-  style="text-align:center; background:#fbb;"
| 158 || September 29 || @ Athletics || 4–7 (10) || Balfour (3–2) || Pérez (1–3) || || 21,517 || 73–85 ||
|-  style="text-align:center; background:#fbb;"
| 159 || September 30 || @ Athletics || 2–5 || Doolittle (2–1) || Kelley (2–4) || Balfour (22) || 21,057 || 73–86 ||
|-  style="text-align:center; background:#fbb;"
| 160 || October 1 || Angels || 4–8 || Wilson (13–10) || Hernández (13–9) || || 13,963 || 73–87 ||
|-  style="text-align:center; background:#bfb;"
| 161 || October 2 || Angels || 6–1 || Iwakuma (9–5) || Haren (12–13) || || 14,353 || 74–87 ||
|-  style="text-align:center; background:#bfb;"
| 162 || October 3 || Angels || 12–0 || Beavan (11–11) || Weaver (20–5) || || 15,614 || 75–87 ||
|-

Standings

American League West

American League Wild Card

Record against opponents

Roster

Farm system

References

External links
2012 Seattle Mariners season Official Site
2012 Seattle Mariners season at Baseball Reference

Seattle Mariners seasons
Seattle Mariners season
Seasttle Marin
Seattle Mariners